Reginald Heber Gooden (March 22, 1910February 11, 2003) was a missionary bishop of The Episcopal Church, serving in Panama and the Canal Zone and later in Louisiana.  His father, Robert Burton Gooden, was also a bishop.

References

American bishops
1910 births
2003 deaths
Episcopal bishops of Louisiana
Anglican bishops of Panama
20th-century American clergy